Ram Jaipal College is a Post Graduate, NAAC Accrediated College in Chhapra, Saran, Bihar, India. It is a constituent unit of Jai Prakash University. The college offers intermediate, three years degree course (TDC) in arts and science and PG Degree in four subjects namely Physics, Zoology, Political Science and History. It also has  NCC and NSS wings. The college is having good library named on great freedom fighter from  Chapra Shri Mazharul Haq.

History 
The college was established in the year 1971.

Departments 
The college offers a bachelor's degree in following disciplines.
 Science
Physics
Mathematics
Chemistry
Zoology
Botany
 Arts
 English
Hindi
Urdu
Sanskrit
Philosophy
Economics
Political Science
History
Psychology

The college offers a master's degree in following subjects.
Physics
Zoology
History
Political Science

References

External links 

 Jai Prakash University website

Colleges in India
Constituent colleges of Jai Prakash University
Educational institutions established in 1971
1971 establishments in Bihar